The Roman Theatre is an ancient building in  Aosta, north-western Italy.

It was built in the late reign of Augustus, some decades after the foundation of the city (25 BC), as testified by the presence of pre-existing structures in the area. There was also an amphitheatre, built during the reign of Claudius, located nearby.

It was restored in 2009. Since 2011, the theatre is used for music shows and theatrical performs.

Description
The theatre occupies three blocks annexed to the ancient city walls, along the Roman main road (the decumanus maximus, next to the Porta Prætoria.

The cavea was enclosed in a rectangular-shaped wall including the remaining southern part. This was reinforced by buttresses each  from the other, and included by four orders of arcades which lightened its structure. It has been supposed that the theatre once had an upper cover, in the same way of the Theatre of Pompey in Rome. 

The scene, of which only the foundations remain, was decorated by Corinthian columns and statues and was covered with marble slabs.

A marketplace surrounded by storehouses on three sides with a temple in the centre with two on the open (south) side, as well as a thermae, also have been discovered.

See also
 List of Roman theatres

External links

Aosta Valley tourism website (multilingual)

Buildings and structures in Aosta
Aosta
Buildings and structures completed in the 1st century BC